Mary Pat Angelini (born December 8, 1954) is an American Republican Party politician who served in the New Jersey General Assembly for the 11th legislative district from 2008 to 2016.

Education 
Angelini graduated with a Bachelor of Social Work degree from East Tennessee State University and an M.P.A. from Fairleigh Dickinson University.

Career 
Since 1992, she has served as executive director of Prevention First, which urged that educational programs and services to schools, businesses, and community organizations counter what she characterized as the negative effects of drug abuse and violence. Her work there led her to become an advocate against the legalization of recreational marijuana in the State.

Angelini sponsored legislation to establish an Anti-Bullying Bill of Rights in New Jersey. The bill was signed by New Jersey Governor Chris Christie early in 2011. The law encourages school districts to better investigate reports of bullying and was drafted in response to the suicide of Tyler Clementi.

Angelini and running mate Caroline Casagrande were defeated in their 2015 re-election bid to Democratic challengers Joann Downey and Eric Houghtaling.

In October 2022, Angelini was appointed to serve on the board of trustees of Brookdale Community College.

Personal life 
Angelini is a resident of Ocean Township, Monmouth County.

References

External links
New Jersey Legislature financial disclosure forms
2012 2011 2010 2009 2008 2007

1954 births
Living people
East Tennessee State University alumni
Fairleigh Dickinson University alumni
Republican Party members of the New Jersey General Assembly
People from Ocean Township, Monmouth County, New Jersey
Women state legislators in New Jersey
21st-century American politicians
21st-century American women politicians